Aptuca (Africa) or Henchir Oudeka, also known as Aptucca/Aptuca, Henchir-Oudeka/Henchir-Semmech. or Udeka is a village and archaeological site in Tunisia, North Africa located at 36.409344, 8.940301.

History
During Roman and Byzantine times the town was an oppidum civilium on the Oued Tessa river. south east of Bulla Regis. Origines Ecclesiasticae calls it 'A city in Africa Proconsilaris'.

Bishopric
The town was also the seat of an ancient bishopric. which remains a titular see of the Roman Catholic Church. Known bishops include:
Victor 411 (Conference of Carthage) 
Ianuarius fl 411, Donatist bishop at the Council of Carthage (411). 
Ianuarius 425  
Alfonso Niehues  (Brazil) 3 August 1965 – May 18, 1967  
Alois Stöger   (Austria) July 3, 1967 – 12 December 1999  
Richard Joseph Malone (United States) 27 January 2000 – 10 February 2004  
Andrews Thazhath  (India) 18 March 2004 – 22 January 2007  
Reinhard Pappenberger (Germany) 6 February 2007

References

Archaeological sites in Tunisia
Catholic titular sees in Africa